Crystal Clear is the third English-language studio album by contemporary Christian artist Jaci Velasquez. It was released in 2000 on Word Entertainment. The album includes two versions; the booklet of one includes only two photographs - one on the cover and the other on the last page of the booklet. The other version is stapled together as a book and includes different artwork and more photographs inside. The album was nominated for the 2001 Grammy Award for Best Pop/Contemporary Gospel Album.

Track listing

Personnel 

 Jaci Velasquez – lead vocals, backing vocals (1, 8, 9)
 Mark Heimmerman – additional sounds (2), keyboards (3–7), programming (3–7), backing vocals (3, 4)
 Rudy Pérez – keyboards (8, 9), programming (8, 9), arrangements (8, 9, 11), string arrangements (8), backing vocals (8), additional keyboards (11), additional programming (11)
 Mark Portmann – keyboards (8, 11), programming (8, 11), arrangements (8, 11)
 Lester Mendez – keyboards (9), programming (9)
 George Cocchini – guitars (1–7, 10)
 Ramón Stagnaro – guitars (8)
 Michael Thompson – guitars (8, 11)
 Chris Rodriguez – guitars (9, 11)
 Jackie Street – bass (1, 2, 4, 6, 7, 10)
 Neil Stubenhaus – bass (8)
 Scott Williamson – drums (1, 2, 4, 6, 7, 10)
 Javier Solis – percussion (1–4, 6, 7, 10)
 Geronimo Enriquez – horns (1, 7), horn arrangements (1, 7)
 Edward Beritez – horns (1, 7)
 Robert Lopez – horns (1, 7)
 Carl Marsh – string arrangements (5)
 Carl Gorodetzky and The Nashville String Machine – strings (5)
 Randall Thornton – string conductor (8)
 Larry Womlow – music copyist (8)
 The Utah Symphony – strings (8)
 David Davidson – strings (10)
 Paul Garcia – backing vocals (1)
 Abel Orta – backing vocals (1)
 Yvonne Solis – backing vocals (1)
 Lisa Bevill – backing vocals (2, 3, 5, 7)
 Perry Heimmerman – backing vocals (4)
 Peyton Heimmerman – backing vocals (4)
 Wendy Pederson – backing vocals (8, 11)
 Betty Wright – backing vocals (8, 11)
 Luis Fonsi – lead and backing vocals (9)
 Michael Tait – backing vocals (10)
 Lisa Cochran – backing vocals (11)
 Jonathan Fuzessy – backing vocals (11)
 Chris Harris – backing vocals (11)
 Carl Ramsey – backing vocals (11)
 Margaret Reynolds – backing vocals (11)

Production

 Mark Heimmerman – producer (1–7, 10)
 Rudy Pérez – producer (8, 9, 11)
 Loren Balman – vocal producer (8)
 Judith Volz – vocal producer (8), executive producer, A&R direction
 Brown Bannister – vocal producer (9)
 Brent Bourgeois – lead vocal producer (11)
 Chris Harris – BGV producer (11)
 Todd Robbins – track recording (1–7, 10), overdub recording (1–7, 10), Pro Tools editing (1–7, 10)
 Joel Numa – recording (8)
 Bruce Weeden – recording (8, 10), mixing (10)
 Steve Bishir – recording (9)
 David Schober – recording (10)
 Shaun Disch – recording assistant (1–7, 10), mix assistant (1, 4, 5, 7, 10)
 Trevor Johnson – recording assistant (1–7, 10), mix assistant (1, 4, 5, 7, 10)
 Chris Mara – recording assistant (1–7, 10)
 Shawn McIntire – recording assistant (8)
 Felipe Tischauer – recording assistant (8, 9, 10)
 Hank Nirider – recording assistant (9, 10)
 Steve MacMillan – mixing (1, 4, 5, 7, 10)
 Tom Laune – mixing (2, 3, 6), recording (8, 10)
 David Cole – mixing (8)
 Ronnie Thomas – digital editing
 Paul Angelli – mastering at Sterling Sound, New York City
 Linda Bourne Wornell – A&R coordinator
 PJ Heimmerman – production manager (1–7, 10)
 Dion Velasquez – production manager (1–7, 10)
 Chuck Hargett – art direction
 Astrid Herbold – design
 Tony Baker – photography
 Chad Curry – wardrobe
 Katinka – hair stylist, make-up

Studios

 Bulldog Studios, Franklin, Tennessee - recording, mixing
 The Sound KitchenFranklin, Tennessee - recording
 Bridgeway Studios, Nashville, Tennessee - recording, mixing
 North Bay Recording Studios, Miami Beach, Florida - recording, mixing
 On the Mark Studio, Los Angeles, California - recording
 Cocoa Butt Studio, Culver City, California - recording
 L.A. East Recording Studio, Salt Lake City, Utah - recording
 Fun Attic Studios, Franklin, Tennessee - overdubs (1–7, 10)
 MasterMix, Nashville, Tennessee - editing

Singles 

 "Imagine Me Without You" (No. 1 on the CCM chart)
 "Every Time I Fall" (No. 1 on the CCM chart)
 "Adore" (No. 1 on the CCM chart; a music video was made for this song)
 "Just a Prayer Away" (No. 1 on the CCM chart)
 "Center of Your Love" (No. 1 on the CCM chart)

Charts

Certifications

References

External links 
 Listing on official site

2000 albums
Jaci Velasquez albums